Alison Helen Gordon (married name Broe) is a female former international table tennis player from England.

Table tennis career
She represented England at five World Table Tennis Championships, in 1981, 1985, 1987, 1989 and 1997, in the Corbillon Cup (women's team event).

She competed in the 1992 Summer Olympics.

She made over 500 international appearances and won seven English National Table Tennis Championships including four singles in 1984, 1988, 1992 and 1996 and also won two English Open titles. Her representative county was Berkshire and she reached a ranking of England number one.

Personal life
She married John Broe.

See also
 List of England players at the World Team Table Tennis Championships

References

Living people
1962 births
English female table tennis players
Table tennis players at the 1992 Summer Olympics
Olympic table tennis players of Great Britain
Sportspeople from Reading, Berkshire